Tony M. Scott (born 1976) is an American football cornerback who was drafted by the New York Jets with the 179th pick in the 6th Round of the 2000 NFL Draft and played for the Jets from 2000 to 2001.

College career
After playing high school football at Burns High School in Lawndale, North Carolina, Scott had a brief stint at Hargrave Military Academy before becoming a starter for the NC State Wolfpack. As a freshman, Scott had 1 interception for 30 yards as NC State finished a struggling 3–8. The next year, Scott had 1 interception for no return yards as the Wolfpack had a 6–5 season. Then as a Junior, Scott had 2 interceptions for 36 yards leading NC State to a 7–5 record. Finally as a Senior, Scott had 4 Interceptions for 38 yards helping NC State finish the year with a 6–6 record. Scott finished his college career with 8 Interception for 104 yards and a 22–24 Career Record.

Professional career

Draft 
Scott entered the 2000 NFL Draft and was selected in the sixth round by the New York Jets with the 179th pick.

Rookie season 
Scott played in all 16 games as a rookie, totaling 1 interception for no yards, 1 fumble recovery, and a tackle as the Jets finished 9–7 with no playoff appearance.

2001 
In his second season Scott only played 7 games due to injuries and only had 3 tackles as the Jets went on to make the playoffs but lose in the wild card round. Scott soon retired after finishing his career with 1 Interception, 1 fumble recovery, and 4 tackles.

References

 https://www.pro-football-reference.com/players/S/ScotTo21.htm
 https://www.sports-reference.com/cfb/players/tony-scott-4.html

1976 births
Living people
NC State Wolfpack football players
American football defensive backs
New York Jets players